Julio César Laffatigue Holub (born 23 February 1980) is an Argentinian retired footballer who played as striker. He has played for teams in his country, Chile, Venezuela and Mexico.

Club career

Early career
Laffatigue debuted at Germinal de Rawson aged 17. Then he joined Club Atlético All Boys in 1998, when he was sent on loan to El Porvenir. Despite his few minutes there, in 2000 was scouted by first-tier giants Club Atlético Independiente. Nevertheless, he didn't play any game there during the 2000–01 season.

After brief spells at Racing de Córdoba and Deportivo Armenio, he went on his career in Chile, joining Deportes Concepción from the Primera División in 2004. The next year, he moved to Everton de Viña del Mar scoring 4 goals in 18 matches during the 2005 Torneo Apertura. For that year's second half, he signed for Deportes Puerto Montt, also from Chile's top-level, scoring only 3 goals in 18 matches for the Torneo Clausura.

On 25 July 2005, he alongside Puerto Montt's team, were involved in a traffic accident when they were coming back by bus from Talca. Laffatigue declared: "Thank God we are alive, because it was a terrible thing". His most damaged teammate was the keeper Javier di Gregorio, who had to face a six-month injury.

Venezuela and Chile

Italmaracaibo
In 2006, Laffatigue left Chile and moved to Venezuela, when he signed for Italmaracaibo (now called Deportivo Petare F.C.). He scored seven goals and played 16 games during 2005–06 Venezuelan football season's last part.

Unión Atlético Maracaibo
For the incoming season, he joined to Unión Atlético Maracaibo. In 2007's first semester, he helped UA Maracaibo to reach the Torneo Clausura title. That season the team was coached by Chilean manager Jorge Pellicer and was teammate of Diego Rivarola, Chilean giants Universidad de Chile's idol.

Cobresal
In mid-2007, he returned to Chile and was signed by Cobresal after didn't renew his contract with Maracaibo. During his spell there, it's well remembered his bicycle kick goal against Colo-Colo on 12 August. He had 32 appearances and scored a total of 13 goals for Cobresal.

Universidad de Concepción
In mid-2008, he joined to Universidad de Concepcion, team coached by Argentinian Marcelo Barticciotto. In that team, he won his second professional title: the 2008–09 Copa Chile (again with Pellicer as manager).

Querétaro F.C.
On 12 December 2009, it was reported that Laffatigue was appointed as player of Querétaro F.C. from the Mexican Primera División. He only scored 2 goals in 13 matches during his spell: in a 3–2 win over UNAM Pumas on 17 February, and in a 1–1 draw with Santos Laguna on 27 February (when was sent-off by double yellow card).

Honours

Club
Unión Atlético Maracaibo
 Venezuelan Primera División (1): 2007 Clausura

Universidad de Concepción
 Copa Chile (1): 2008–09

References

External links
  BDFA profile
 Laffatigue at Soccerway

1980 births
Living people
Sportspeople from Córdoba Province, Argentina
Argentine footballers
Argentine expatriate footballers
All Boys footballers
Club Atlético Independiente footballers
Gimnasia y Tiro footballers
Racing de Córdoba footballers
Everton de Viña del Mar footballers
Universidad de Concepción footballers
Deportes Concepción (Chile) footballers
Club Deportivo Palestino footballers
Cobresal footballers
Querétaro F.C. footballers
Deportivo Italia players
Primera B de Chile players
Chilean Primera División players
Liga MX players
Expatriate footballers in Chile
Expatriate footballers in Mexico
Expatriate footballers in Venezuela
Argentine expatriate sportspeople in Chile
Argentine expatriate sportspeople in Mexico
Argentine expatriate sportspeople in Venezuela
Association football forwards